Jakob Resch is a West German bobsledder who competed in the late 1970s. He won two bronze medals at the FIBT World Championships (Two-man: 1978, Four-man: 1977).

Resch now operates the Hindenburglinde hotel, located in Ramsau bei Berchtesgaden, Germany.

References
Bobsleigh two-man world championship medalists since 1931
Bobsleigh four-man world championship medalists since 1930
Hindenburglinde hotel site where Resch works as of 2008. 

German male bobsledders
Living people
Year of birth missing (living people)